The 2003 Konica V8 Supercar Series was an Australian motor racing competition held for V8 Supercars. It was the fourth V8 Supercar Development Series. The series began on 23 February 2003 at Wakefield Park and finished on 31 August at Mallala Motor Sport Park after sixteen races at six rounds held across three different states.

Series winner Mark Winterbottom won eight of the 16 races and four of the six rounds. The new points system placed an increased emphasis on finishing races and series runner up Matthew White scored just 58 points less than Winterbottom, despite taking only two race wins and six top three race finishes.

Teams and drivers
The following teams and drivers competed in the 2003 Konica V8 Supercar Series. This was the last season that the Holden VS Commodore and Ford EL Falcon was eligible.

Race calendar

Points system
The series consisted of six rounds across three different states. Rounds 1 and 3–6 consisted of three races. The second race of each weekend saw the finishing order of race 1 reversed to form the grid, a 'reverse grid' race. Round 2 consisted of a single race. Points were awarded for all cars who finished each race in finishing order. Points may have been offered beyond the 29th position but at no point during the series did more than 29 cars finish a race. Round 2's single race carried three times the points of a single race elsewhere in the series.
The pointscore also saw the worst round result deducted, although the worst result had to be a round the competitor had entered.

Series standings 
Points table referenced, in part, as follows:

References

External links
 2003 Racing Results Archive

See also
 2003 V8 Supercar season

Konica
Supercars Development Series